(3S,6E)-nerolidol synthase (EC 4.2.3.48, (E)-nerolidol synthase, nerolidol synthase, (3S)-(E)-nerolidol synthase, FaNES1) is an enzyme with systematic name (2E,6E)-farnesyl-diphosphate diphosphate-lyase ((3S,6E)-nerolidol-forming). This enzyme catalyses the following chemical reaction

 (2E,6E)-farnesyl diphosphate + H2O  (3S,6E)-nerolidol + diphosphate

The enzyme catalyses a step in the formation of (3E)-4,8-dimethylnona-1,3,7-triene.

References

External links 
 

EC 4.2.3